Lochlann Óg Ó Dálaigh, early modern Irish poet, fl. ca. 1610.

A native of Munster and a member of the Ó Dálaigh clan of poets, he wrote poetry lamenting the eclipse of the native society and culture of Ireland. Cait ar ghabhader Gaoidhil? ("Where have the Gaels gone?") he asked, and answered himself thus: "In their place we have a proud impure swarm of foreigners".

He was a son of Tadhg Óg Ó Dálaigh.

References
Uaigneach a-taoi, a theach na mbráthar in Dioghluim Dána, Lambert McKenna (ed), Dublin, 1938, pp. 423–425
A Poem on the Downfall of the Gaoídhil, William Gillies, Éigse, 13 (1969–70), pp. 203–10
Irish Bardic Poetry, Grene & Kelly (ed.), Dublin, 1970.

External links
http://www.ucc.ie/celt/published/G402145/index.html

17th-century Irish writers
16th-century births
17th-century deaths
Irish poets
Irish-language poets
Medieval Irish writers